Strictly Come Dancing  returned for its eighteenth series with a launch show on 17 October 2020 on BBC One, with the live shows starting on 24 October. Due to the COVID-19 pandemic, the series launched a month later than usual and ran for nine weeks instead of the usual thirteen. Tess Daly and Claudia Winkleman returned as hosts, while Zoe Ball and Rylan Clark-Neal returned to host Strictly Come Dancing: It Takes Two. In four shows Clark-Neal was replaced by Gethin Jones after coming into contact with someone who tested positive for COVID-19.

On 12 September, it was announced that for the first time since the tenth series, there would be no live show broadcast from the Blackpool Tower Ballroom, also due to the pandemic. There was also no Halloween Special for the first time since the seventh series. However, it was announced shortly afterwards that there would be four episodes highlighting best moments by week from previous series. This started on 19 September, with Movie Week Highlights, Blackpool, followed by Musicals up until The Grand Final. The Grand Final episode featured a tribute to 2014 winner Caroline Flack, who died on 15 February that year.

Craig Revel Horwood, Shirley Ballas and Motsi Mabuse returned to the judging panel for their eighteenth, fourth and second series respectively. On 21 August 2020, it was announced that Bruno Tonioli would not be part of the judging panel for this series, due to travel restrictions imposed by the COVID-19 pandemic and his role on Dancing with the Stars. Tonioli instead appeared virtually to give his verdict on the performances during the Sunday night results show. Motsi Mabuse had to miss weeks 4 and 5 in accordance with British government guidelines after travelling to Germany due to a break in at her dance academy; she was replaced by Anton du Beke, who became a permanent judge the following series replacing Tonioli.

The series was won by Bill Bailey and his professional partner Oti Mabuse. At 55 years old, Bailey became the oldest winner in the show's history, and Mabuse became the first professional dancer to win the show for the second consecutive time, as well as the second professional dancer to win twice, the first being Aliona Vilani.

Professional dancers 
On 6 March 2020, Kevin Clifton announced he was leaving the show after seven years. Despite being confirmed in the 2020 professional line-up, on 26 March 2020, AJ Pritchard announced he was leaving the show after four years. The other professional dancers from 2019 were all confirmed to be returning for the series. Gorka Márquez received a celebrity partner for the first time since 2018; however, Neil Jones and Nadiya Bychkova only featured in group dances after having partners the previous year, alongside Graziano Di Prima and Nancy Xu.

Due to the pandemic, several changes had to be made in how the professional dancers performed. Firstly, the dancers had to shield at home for two weeks. They then formed a bubble which allowed them to stay in a hotel together and to practise their dances there. All the group dances were pre-recorded and played throughout the series.

Couples
On 1 September 2020, the first three celebrities announced to be participating in the series were Caroline Quentin, Jason Bell and Max George. On 2 September 2020, it was announced that Olympic boxer, Nicola Adams would feature in the first same-sex couple. On 3 September 2020, Made in Chelsea star Jamie Laing was announced to be participating in the series after withdrawing from the seventeenth series due to a foot injury. Celebrity reveals continued throughout the week until the full line-up was revealed on 4 September 2020. Due to the shorter series, only 12 couples competed, the fewest since the third series in 2005. On 12 November 2020, it was announced that Katya Jones had tested positive for COVID-19, which due to government guidelines on self-isolation, meant that she and Nicola were forced to withdraw from the competition.

Scoring chart

Average chart

Highest and lowest scoring performances of the series
The highest and lowest performances in each dance according to the judges' scale are as follows:

Couples' highest and lowest scoring dances

Weekly scores and songs
Unless indicated otherwise, individual judges scores in the charts below (given in parentheses) are listed in this order from left to right: Craig Revel Horwood, Shirley Ballas, Motsi Mabuse.

Launch show
Musical guests: Joel Corry feat. MNEK—"Head & Heart"

Week 1
Running order

Week 2
Musical guest: Sam Smith—"Diamonds"
 Running order

Judges' votes to save

Horwood: Jamie & Karen
Mabuse: Jamie & Karen
Ballas: Did not vote, but would have voted to save Jamie & Karen

Week 3: Movie Week
Musical guest: The Kanneh-Masons—"Ave Maria"
 Running order

Judges' votes to save

Horwood: Nicola & Katya
Mabuse: Nicola & Katya
Ballas: Did not vote, but would have voted to save Nicola & Katya

Week 4
Individual judges scores in the charts below (given in parentheses) are listed in this order from left to right: Craig Revel Horwood, Shirley Ballas, Anton du Beke.
Musical guest: The Vamps—"Married in Vegas"
 Running order

Nicola & Katya withdrew from the competition, after Katya tested positive for COVID-19.
Judges' votes to save

Horwood: Maisie & Gorka
Du Beke: Maisie & Gorka
Ballas: Did not vote, but would have voted to save Max & Dianne

Week 5
Individual judges scores in the charts below (given in parentheses) are listed in this order from left to right: Craig Revel Horwood, Shirley Ballas, Anton du Beke.
Musical guest: Billy Ocean —"Love Really Hurts Without You"/"Red Light Spells Danger"/"When the Going Gets Tough, the Tough Get Going" 
 Running order

Judges' votes to save

Horwood: Maisie & Gorka
Du Beke: Maisie & Gorka
Ballas: Did not vote, but would have voted to save Maisie & Gorka

Week 6
Musical guest: Gary Barlow—"Elita"
Dance guests: Michael & Jowita—"Spectrum (Say My Name)"
 Running order

Judges' votes to save

Horwood: Clara & Aljaž
Mabuse: Jamie & Karen
Ballas: Jamie & Karen

Week 7: Musicals Week (Quarter-final)
Musical guest: Marisha Wallace—"Climb Ev'ry Mountain"
Running order

Judges' votes to save

Horwood: Jamie & Karen
Mabuse: JJ & Amy
Ballas: Jamie & Karen

Week 8: Semi-Final
Musical guest: Little Mix—"Break Up Song"
Running order

For the Dance Off, Jamie & Karen chose to dance their Salsa, while Ranvir & Giovanni chose to dance their Waltz.
Judges' votes to save

Horwood: Jamie & Karen
Mabuse: Ranvir & Giovanni
Ballas: Jamie & Karen

Week 9: Final
Musical guest: Robbie Williams—"Time for Change"
Running order

Dance chart

 Highest scoring dance
 Lowest scoring dance
 Couple withdrew that week

Week 1: American Smooth, Cha-Cha-Cha, Foxtrot, Jive, Paso Doble, Quickstep, Samba, Tango or Waltz
Week 2: One unlearned dance (introducing Salsa, Street/Commercial and Viennese Waltz)
Week 3 (Movie Week): One unlearned dance (introducing Charleston and Theatre/Jazz)
Week 4: One unlearned dance
Week 5: One unlearned dance (introducing Argentine Tango)
Week 6: One unlearned dance
Week 7 (Musicals Week): One unlearned dance
Week 8 (Semi-Final): Two unlearned dances (introducing Rumba)
Week 9 (Final): Judges' choice, showdance and couple's favourite dance

Ratings
Weekly ratings for each show on BBC One. All ratings are provided by BARB.

References

External links
 

Series 18
2020 British television seasons